is a 2012 episodic platform video game in the Sonic the Hedgehog series, and the sequel to Sonic the Hedgehog 4: Episode I. The game was developed by Dimps, with assistance from Sonic Team, and published by Sega. The game was intended to emulate the original Sonic the Hedgehog games on the Sega Genesis.

Episode II was released in May 2012 for Microsoft Windows (via Steam), PlayStation Network, Xbox Live Arcade, Android, and iOS, and in July 2013 for Ouya, and Nvidia Shield (as a preinstalled app). A version for the Windows Phone was slated to be released in July 2012, but was cancelled. A Wii version was planned to be released via WiiWare, although it was cancelled due to hardware constraints. An additional episode, "Episode Metal", which centers around Metal Sonic, is available for those who purchase both episodes for the same system.

The game received mixed reviews from critics, although it was generally considered an improvement over Episode I, with praise for the game's improved physics, co-op mechanics and visuals, but criticism for its boss fights and level design. A third game in the series, Sonic the Hedgehog 4: Episode III, was planned but was ultimately cancelled.

Gameplay

Sonic the Hedgehog 4: Episode II is a 2D side-scrolling platformer reminiscent of the original Sonic games for the Sega Mega Drive/Genesis. It plays similarly to the previous episode, with several enhancements. Sonic is now accompanied by Tails, either controlled by the computer or a second player via local or online co-operative play. Unlike the earlier 16-bit games, neither Sonic nor Tails can be controlled individually. There are various combination moves Sonic and Tails can perform together, such as Tails lifting Sonic up to places he would be unable to reach otherwise, or the two rolling into a ball to perform a fast and powerful spin attack.

Special Stages in Episode II are accessed similarly to Episode I (finishing an act with at least 50 rings; then jumping into the Giant Ring at the end of the stage), and are based on the half-pipe format introduced in Sonic the Hedgehog 2, in which the player must collect a certain number of rings before the goal in order to obtain a Chaos Emerald. The game features Red Star Rings, which appears in Sonic Colors and Sonic Generations, with one Red Ring hidden per act.

Cross-compatibility was planned for the Xbox Live Arcade and Windows Phone versions, allowing players to alternate their games using Cloud saving, though the idea was removed due to the Windows Phone version being cancelled.

Owners of both Episode I and II on the same system can unlock free "Episode Metal" content in Episode II. "Episode Metal" explains how Metal Sonic was revived after being defeated in Sonic CD. Players can control Metal Sonic through four acts, all of which are reworked from the first act of each Zone in Episode I.

Plot
Metal Sonic survived his previous defeat in Sonic CD, but was severely damaged, and left on Little Planet when it disappeared at the end of the game. After the events of Episode I, Little Planet returns, and Dr. Eggman locates and repairs Metal Sonic. Sonic hears that Eggman is back and reunites with Tails to stop him. Meanwhile, Metal Sonic, after receiving a mysterious power source, searches for the heroes and sees them fly away in the Tornado, following them using Tails' rocket.

It is revealed that Eggman plans to construct a new  over Little Planet. As the dwarf planet heads back into space, Sonic and Tails follow the villains to the Death Egg. Inside, they confront and defeat Metal Sonic. Later, they defeat Eggman at the heart of the base. Sonic and Tails then escape via space pods just before the Death Egg begins to explode. As the credits roll, the duo head back to Earth while the Death Egg shuts down.

Development
In February 2011, Sonic the Hedgehog 4: Episode II was confirmed to be in early development. Sega Brand Manager Ken Balough stated: "the idea is to introduce new zones with things you haven't seen." He also hinted that Episode II may have a larger budget than Episode I, due to the commercial success of Episode I. Balough stated that many ideas in Episode II were planned while the first episode was under development. Sega of America Community Manager Aaron Webber hinted that Tails may appear in Episode II. On August 23, 2011, Sonic Team head Takashi Iizuka stated: "this year, 2011, is the anniversary, so we're focusing on the celebration title, but moving forward to 2012, Sonic will still be going, so I'd hope to provide Episode 2 then." He also said that Sonic Team "knew about the anniversary year," and that "Generations was planned way in advance." As such, "it was always our plan to release Episode 2 after Generations." Preparing for Episode IIs release, Sega re-released Sonic CD to digital platforms in late 2011, billing it as a 'prequel' to Sonic 4, as Episode II’s story would rely heavily on what occurred in CD.

On December 29, a teaser trailer for Episode II was released, and revealed that both Metal Sonic and Tails would be returning. It was revealed that the game would feature an updated graphics and physics engine from Episode I. Platforms confirmed for release were Xbox Live Arcade, PlayStation Network, iOS, Android, Windows Phone and PC. It was confirmed that no WiiWare version of Episode II would be released, with it being highly assumed that the Wii version was cancelled due to hardware constraints.

On April 21, 2012, an early beta version of Episode II was accidentally made available to people who pre-ordered the game on Steam. However, Sega quickly removed it.

In March 2012, Iizuka said that Sega was not planning on releasing further episodes of Sonic 4. In 2015, it was revealed that Sonic 4 was originally conceptualized as a trilogy, but plans to develop Episode III were abandoned.

Reception

Sonic the Hedgehog 4: Episode II received mixed reviews. Review aggregator website Metacritic gave the PlayStation 3 version 63/100, the Xbox 360 version 61/100, the PC version 54/100, and the iOS version 66/100.

The game's improved physics and visuals were the most praised aspects of the game. Many reviewers considered it an improvement over its predecessor. The co-op mechanics were also praised. However, complaints were raised on its repetitive boss fights and level design. IGN Lucas M. Thomas gave the game a score of 6.5, stating that while it fixes the physics problems of Episode I, it is still missing the "magic" of its Genesis predecessors. GamesRadar+ Lucas Sullivan criticized it in similar ways, stating that the two-player mode "seems to prioritize griefing your friends instead making real in-game progress," and further stating that "every time we felt like we were reliving our old Sonic glory days, the next stage would incorporate limp and uninspired gimmicks like shifting winds or avalanche snowboarding." Electronic Gaming Monthly Ray Carsillo gave the game a 6.5, praising the "old-school Sonic" aspects of the gameplay, but criticizing the Tails-related gameplay, stating "there were too many puzzles that required Tails' assistance." Joystiq Richard Mitchell had mixed feelings on the game as well, awarding it 3 out of 5 stars, and stating "Episode 2 makes improvements over its predecessor, with better visuals, useful co-op maneuvers and great special stages, but the inconsistent boss battles and uninspired level design keep it from recapturing Sonic's glory days." GameTrailers gave the game a score of 5.5, saying that the level design and the team-up moves often slow the pace of the game. Official Xbox Magazine (UK) Jon Blyth was more positive, concluding that the game was "a smooth, slippery Sonic that takes another step away from  single-button origins without losing any of the hog essence. With local and online co-op, it offers just enough entertainment to justify its steep episodic price."

Notes

References

External links
Official website
Sonic the Hedgehog 4: Episode II at MobyGames

2012 video games
Android (operating system) games
Cancelled Wii games
Dimps games
Episodic video games
Interquel video games
IOS games
Platform games
PlayStation Network games
PlayStation 3 games
Sonic the Hedgehog video games
Sega video games
Side-scrolling video games
Sonic Team games
Video game sequels
Video games with 2.5D graphics
Cancelled Windows Phone games
Xbox 360 Live Arcade games
Windows games
Ouya games
Multiplayer and single-player video games
Video games scored by Jun Senoue
Video games developed in Japan